Deep Water Cay Airport  is a private use airport located in Deep Water Cay, in the Bahamas.

See also
List of airports in the Bahamas

References

External links 
 Airport record for Deep Water Cay Airport at Landings.com

Airports in the Bahamas